The Day After Gettysburg is an alternate history novel written by Robert Conroy. It was published by Baen Books online as an ebook and hardcover book on June 6, 2017 and then released a paperback version a few weeks later on June 26. As Conroy had died  in late 2014, two and a half years before the book was published, it was released posthumously with author J. R. Dunn finishing and releasing it.

Plot
After being defeated at the Battle of Gettysburg in July 1863, Confederate General Robert E. Lee does not retreat across the Potomac River and his eventual surrender at Appomattox. He instead turns the tables on Union General George Meade with a vicious counterattack that sets the Union Army on its heels.

References

2017 American novels
American alternate history novels
Novels by Robert Conroy
Gettysburg campaign
Baen Books books